The 2015 Zhonghong Jiangxi International Women's Tennis Open is a professional tennis tournament played on hard courts. It is the second edition of the tournament which is part of the 2015 WTA 125K series and will take in Nanchang, China, from July 27 to August 2, 2015.

Singles draw entrants

Seeds 

 1 Rankings are as of 20 July 2015.

Other entrants 
The following players received wildcards into the singles main draw:
  Gao Xinyu
  Jelena Janković
  Liang Chen
  Zhang Ying
  Zheng Wushuang

The following players received entry from the qualifying draw:
  Alison Bai
  Makoto Ninomiya
  Kyōka Okamura
  Erika Sema

Doubles draw entrants

Seeds

Champions

Singles 

  Jelena Janković def.  Chang Kai-chen 6–3, 7–6(8–6)

Doubles 

  Chang Kai-chen /  Zheng Saisai def.  Chan Chin-wei /  Wang Yafan 6–3, 4–6, [10–3]

References 

2015 WTA 125K series
2015
2015 in Chinese tennis